Athens station is a historic railroad building in Athens, Ohio, proximate to Ohio University. It was listed in the National Register of Historic Places on January 11, 1983 as the Athens B & O Train Depot. The tracks of the Baltimore and Ohio Railroad went past this site, before they were removed and the trackbed made a parking lot.

This building is currently under lease to a private concern.

In most of its years of service, it was a stop on the Baltimore and Ohio's direct route between Washington, D.C. and Cincinnati. It served the daily B&O trains, Diplomat (St. Louis - Jersey City, NJ) and National Limited (St. Louis - Jersey City, NJ). In the last years leading to B&O's yielding routes to Amtrak in 1971, the B&O's Metropolitan (shortened and rerouted: Cincinnati - Washington, D.C.) made stops at Athens station.

The station was used by Amtrak's Shenandoah (Cincinnati - Washington, D.C.), operating between 1976 and 1981.

References

External links

 Ohio Railroad Structures, by William Eric McFadden

Railway stations closed in 1981
Railway stations on the National Register of Historic Places in Ohio
Former Baltimore and Ohio Railroad stations
National Register of Historic Places in Athens County, Ohio
Buildings and structures in Athens, Ohio
Repurposed railway stations in the United States
Former railway stations in Ohio
Former Amtrak stations in Ohio